The Pickathon Music Festival (commonly called Pickathon or Pickathon Festival) is an annual three-day music festival located just outside Portland, Oregon on Pendarvis Farm. Occurring nearly every August since 1999, the festival has hosted a wide variety of artists from genres including indie, rock, rap, folk and bluegrass. The festival is well known for promoting more sustainable environmental practices such as offering eco-friendly transportation, use of solar energy, recycling, composting, and the elimination of plastic tableware. Pickathon also offers camping and food options on site. Unlike many other successful music festivals, Pickathon has no corporate sponsors and caps ticket sales.

Organization 
As part of the COVID-19 pandemic, the company received between $150,000 and $350,000 in federally-backed small business loans as part of the Paycheck Protection Program. The company stated this would allow the retention of three jobs.

Environmental sustainability 
Over the years, Pickathon has gained notability for promoting sustainable practices. It offers eco-friendly transportation and encourages biking to the festival. In 2011, it successfully eliminated all plastic tableware, the first large U.S. festival to do so. Patrons are expected to bring tableware from home or purchase/borrow from a vendor. Pickathon also uses its own solar energy and sustainable fuel. In addition, groups of volunteer recycling and composting teams work throughout the festival. Pickathon has promised to keep working towards more sustainable options for the future.

History

1999-2004 

Pickathon started in 1999 as a fundraiser for the FM radio station, KBOO. The first venue was Horning's Hideout, a private park in North Plains, Oregon. The first Pickathon only managed to host around 90 people, including performers. Attendance stayed relatively low until 2004 with attendance around the low hundreds. Pickathon's founder, Zale Schoenborn, suggested it took "a miracle for the festival to survive through those rough first years".

2005 
In 2005, Horning's Hideout backed out two months before the 7th annual event was scheduled. Festival organisers found a replacement property in Woodburn, Oregon. This was the first year with both running water and electricity.

2006 
In 2006, Pickathon relocated once again to Pendarvis Farms in Happy Valley, Oregon. which is still the festival ground.

2011 
In an effort to become more environmentally friendly, Pickathon eliminated all plastic tableware.

2019 
On August 8, two arborists and workers of GuildWorks died when a boom lift, which was set on an incline, toppled over during the takedown of the festival. According to a statement released by the Clackamas County Sheriff's Office, the workers were ascending the lift when the incident occurred. In February 2020, the Oregon Occupational Safety and Health Administration issued $31,000 in fines to Pickathon LLC and GuildWorks LLC for failing to follow safety precautions. A memorial fund was created for both of the victim's families.

2020 - 2021
Pickathon was cancelled in 2020 and 2021 because of the COVID-19 pandemic.

References 

Annual events in Oregon
Music festivals in Oregon
1998 establishments in Oregon